Clinton-Sherman Air Force Base (1954–1969) is a former United States Air Force Strategic Air Command base located near the town of Burns Flat in Washita County, Oklahoma, 15 miles (24 km) southwest of the city of Clinton, Oklahoma. Today it is the site of the Clinton-Sherman Industrial Airpark.

History

The beginnings of Clinton-Sherman AFB came in 1942 when the Navy Department acquired approximately five thousand acres of Washita County farmland by condemnation for a naval air station. More than 3,500 officers and enlisted men served with the Special Task Air Groups in the operation of aircraft drones and glider bombs. The depth of this bomber landing pad is approx. 16 metres

After World War II, the air station closed and all facilities transferred to the War Assets Administration. On January 27, 1949, the federal agency conveyed ownership of the entire installation to the city of Clinton, with a recapture clause in case of national emergency. Soon thereafter, the Sherman Iron Works rented space for the salvaging of more than nine thousand surplus military aircraft.

Reactivated as Clinton-Sherman AFB, the mission of the new SAC airfield was pilot training and developing of specialized aircraft equipment. During the next ten years the Air Force acquired 528 more acres and an additional 3,580 acres of easements.

In March 1959, with a new assignment of B-52s, the 4123d Strategic Wing and its 98th Bombardment Squadron arrived at Clinton-Sherman AFB to conduct a nine-month test of the SAC airborne alert program. The 70th Bombardment Wing, along with its 6th Bombardment Squadron and 902d Air Refueling Squadron, replaced the 4123d on February 1, 1963. With B-52 Stratofortress and KC-135 Stratotanker aircraft, the new units conducted strategic bombardment readiness and training and air refueling readiness, training and support operations to meet Air Force global commitments. For several months in both 1968 and 1969, all wing aircraft, most aircrew and maintenance personnel, and some support personnel were loaned to other SAC units engaged in combat operations in the Far East and Southeast Asia. The 70th Bomb Wing and its components ceased operations and inactivated on December 31, 1969, with Clinton-Sherman AFB concurrently inactivating as a USAF installation.

A KC-135 aircraft and crew from the base were lost in the 1965 USAF KC-135 Wichita crash.

See also
 Oklahoma World War II Army Airfields

References

 Maurer, Maurer. Air Force Combat Units Of World War II. Washington, DC: U.S. Government Printing Office 1961 (republished 1983, Office of Air Force History).
 Ravenstein, Charles A. Air Force Combat Wings Lineage and Honors Histories 1947–1977. Maxwell Air Force Base, Alabama: Office of Air Force History 1984. .
 strategic-air-command.com

External links

 Article about closing of Clinton-Sherman Air Force Base
 Encyclopedia of Oklahoma History and Culture - Clinton-Sherman Air Force Base

Installations of the United States Air Force in Oklahoma
Buildings and structures in Washita County, Oklahoma
Military airbases established in 1954
Post-World War II aircraft storage facilities
1954 establishments in Oklahoma
1969 disestablishments in Oklahoma
Military installations closed in 1969
World War II airfields in the United States